The 1961 Kentucky Wildcats football team were an American football team that represented the University of Kentucky as a member of the Southeastern Conference during the 1961 NCAA University Division football season. In their eighth season under head coach Blanton Collier, the team compiled a 5–5 record (2–4 in the SEC).

Schedule

References

Kentucky
Kentucky Wildcats football seasons
Kentucky Wildcats football